Alluitsup Paa Heliport  is a heliport in the northern part of Alluitsup Paa, a village in the Kujalleq municipality in southern Greenland.

Airlines and destinations

References

Heliports in Greenland